Gieljan Tissingh (born 19 April 1990 in Nunspeet) is a Dutch professional footballer who plays as a centre back. He is currently without a club after having formerly played for FC Zwolle, AGOVV Apeldoorn and FC Oss.

External links
 Voetbal International profile 

1990 births
Living people
Dutch footballers
AGOVV Apeldoorn players
PEC Zwolle players
TOP Oss players
Eerste Divisie players
People from Nunspeet
Association football central defenders
Footballers from Gelderland